New Taipei City Constituency IV includes most of Xinzhuang in New Taipei City. The district was formerly known as Taipei County Constituency IV (2008-2010) and was created in 2008, when all local constituencies of the Legislative Yuan were reorganized to become single-member districts.

Current district
 Xinzhuang: 3 sub-districts
 Xingzhi: 10 urban villages
 Wenming, Wende, Quan'an, Zhongxiao, Ronghe, Wensheng, Wenheng, Quantai, Haishan, Xinghan
 Touqian: 18 urban villages
 Huacheng, Renyi, Zixin, Heping, Changping, Changlong, Xinyi, Sixian, Fuxing, Ren'ai, Zili, Ziqiang, Changping, Changxin, Xingfu, Siyuan, Fuji, Touqian
 Zhonggang: 21 urban villages
 Zhongping, Zhonghong, Zhongxin, Zhongmei, Zhonghua, Zhonglong, Liren, Liyan, Liting, Liji, Heng'an, Zhongquan, Zhonghe, Zhongyuan, Zhongtai, Zhonggang, Zhongcheng, Ligong, Lizhi, Litai, Lide
 Danfeng: 15 urban villages
 Danfeng, Taifeng, Guotai, Fumin, Fuying, Yingpan, Fengnian, Shuangfeng, Hefeng, Xiangfeng, Yumin, Fuguo, Longfu, Longfeng, Qionglin
 Xisheng: 10 urban villages
 Bade, Minquan, Jian'an, Nangang, Houde, Long'an, Chengde, Jianfu, Hougang, Wan'an

Legislators

Election results

 

 
 
 
 
 
 
 
 
 
 
 

2008 establishments in Taiwan
Constituencies in New Taipei